Prescott is a city and the county seat of Nevada County, Arkansas, United States. The community had a population of 3,296 at the 2010 census. Prescott is part of the Hope Micropolitan Statistical Area.

Located 100 miles southwest of Little Rock, Prescott was developed on the Prairie D'Âne, named by French colonists before the United States acquired this area.  The prairie consisted of approximately 25–30 square miles of rolling open land, surrounded by forest. The area had been a well-known crossroads prior to construction of the Cairo & Fulton Railroad. To the west lies the city of Washington, to the east lies the city of Camden, while to the south lies the Red River, with Shreveport, Texarkana, and Dallas beyond.

As of 2014, Prescott and Nevada County had sixteen properties listed on the National Register of Historic Places. Elkin's Ferry Battleground and the Prairie D'Ane Battlefield are further recognized as National Historic Landmarks within a National Historic Landmark District.

History
The city of Prescott was not platted until 1873 during Reconstruction. It was to be a station stop for the Cairo & Fulton Railroad then under construction. The railroad was constructed parallel to the Southwest Trail through northern Nevada County. Prescott was incorporated on October 6, 1874.

The original town site consisted of 48 blocks, 24 on each side of the railroad. The streets were platted in a grid pattern from the railroad line. Streets running east–west use the railroad as a dividing line between their eastern and western halves, and streets running north–south use Main Street as a dividing line between their northern and southern halves.

Prescott grew quickly because the railroad provided a reliable way to transport local products to larger markets. The first post office opened in November 1873, and the first newspaper, The Banner, was established in 1875. The Nevada County seat was moved to Prescott in 1877, which contributed to the town's commercial importance. It became a center of law and government in the county. By the late 1890s, Prescott had its own telephone system and water and light plant.

The timber industry became important to the region's early economy when in 1890, James H. Bemis & Benjamin Whitaker built the Ozan Lumber Company plant in Prescott. That same year, Dr. R. L. Powers began constructing the Prescott & Northwestern Railroad. It transported lumber, peaches, cotton and other products. It also provided passenger service, connecting adjacent communities to the Missouri Pacific Railroad Depot in Prescott.

Historians have speculated on the naming of Prescott: whether it was named after William Hickling Prescott, of Salem, Massachusetts, who was a friend of Cairo & Fulton Railroad officials Thomas Allen and Henry Marquand, or where it was named after the County Surveyor, W. H. Prescott.

Geography
Prescott is located at  (33.802614, -93.381884) on south-southwest section of Prairie D'Âne. The large open prairie was named by French colonists and is located in the Arkansas Timberlands region of the Ark-La-Tex. Prescott is situated in the Gulf Coastal Plain, near the Little Missouri River. This waterway provides Prescott with drinking water and recreational opportunities.

Climate
The climate in Prescott is characterized by hot, humid summers and generally mild to cool winters. According to the Köppen Climate Classification system, Prescott has a humid subtropical climate, abbreviated "Cfa" on climate maps.

Demographics

2020 census

As of the 2020 United States census, there were 3,101 people, 1,212 households, and 804 families residing in the city.

2000 census
As of the census of 2000, there were 3,686 people, 1,421 households, and 912 families residing in the city. The racial makeup of the city was 53.31% White, 44.49% Black or African American, 0.38% Native American, 0.08% Asian, 1.17% from other races, and 0.57% from two or more races. 1.76% of the population were Hispanic or Latino of any race.

There were 1,421 households, out of which 32.1% had children under the age of 18 living with them, 41.6% were married couples living together, 19.5% had a female householder with no husband present, and 35.8% were non-families. 33.6% of all households were made up of individuals, and 18.4% had someone living alone who was 65 years of age or older. The average household size was 2.39 and the average family size was 3.05.

In the city, the population was spread out, with 25.7% under the age of 18, 8.5% from 18 to 24, 26.7% from 25 to 44, 20.3% from 45 to 64, and 18.7% who were 65 years of age or older. The median age was 37 years. For every 100 females, there were 85.7 males. For every 100 females age 18 and over, there were 79.5 males.

The median income for a household in the city was $21,612, and the median income for a family was $28,665. Males had a median income of $27,384 versus $17,289 for females. The per capita income for the city was $11,515. About 27.5% of families and 32.5% of the population were below the poverty line, including 38.7% of those under age 18 and 39.6% of those age 65 or over.

Arts and culture

Annual events
The Fall Festival and Trade Days showcases games, activities and numerous entertainment and sports events. These include a 5K run/walk, arts & crafts booths, a BQ cook-off, balloon liftoff, beauty pageant, bunco tournament, co-ed softball tournament, dessert contest, dunking booth, face painting, food vendors, a great pumpkin treasure hunt, pet costume contest, pie eating contest, sidewalk sales, and the Tyson/Calvin Brown basketball tournament.

Libraries
The Prescott/Nevada County Library was completed on November 4, 2003. It is located in downtown Prescott, and is administered by the Southwest Arkansas Regional Library System.

Museums
Nevada County Depot & Museum - The depot building was designed by Missouri Pacific Railroad architect E. M. Tucker, who also designed railway stations in Little Rock and Texarkana. It was constructed in 1912 and houses permanent exhibits on the Civil War Battles, Railroads, and general history of Prescott and Nevada County. The museum also houses an area archive that is open to researchers.

Education

Public Schools
Prescott's public school system was founded in 1877. Public education for elementary and secondary school students is provided by the Prescott School District, which leads to graduation from Prescott High School. As of the 2015–2016 school year, the district serves more than 1,000 students and employs more than 175 faculty and staff.

Prescott School District includes the following three school facilities:
 Prescott High School, serving students in grades 9 through 12.
 Prescott Junior High School, serving students in grades 5 and 8.
 Prescott Elementary School, serving students in prekindergarten through grade 4.

Transportation

Air
 Kizer Field, (4F7) on the eastern edge of the city.

Rail
 Missouri Pacific Railroad
 Prescott & Northwestern Railroad

Highways
  Interstate 30
  U.S. Highway 67
  U.S. Highway 371
  Arkansas
Highway 332
  Arkansas Highway 24
  Arkansas Highway 19

Media

Print
Hope-Prescott

Radio
 1370 AM KTPA – "The talk of South Arkansas."
Social Media-News

SWARK.Today (Southwest Arkansas), Hope-Prescott

Notable people
 Kirby Allan (Pittman), born 1928, in Prescott, record producer.
 Frederick W. Allsopp - author. Allsopp Park, in Little Rock, was named in his honor.
 Grady Gammage - (born 1892, Prescott) - Arizonan educator, president of Northern Arizona University and Arizona State University. Gammage Auditorium in Tempe, Arizona was named in his honor.
 Walt Goldsby - MLB outfielder, St. Louis Browns, Washington Nationals, Richmond Virginians, Baltimore Orioles.
 Oren Harris - US Representative and United States District Court judge.
 Jerry Louis Latin - (born 1953, Prescott) - NFL running back, St. Louis Cardinals  and St. Louis Rams.
 Ira E. McMillian - (born 1908, Prescott) - U.S. Navy Rear Admiral and Navy Cross recipient.
 Thomas Chipman McRae - Arkansas Representative, Governor, US Representative, US Congress.
 Jim Moore (baseball) - (born 1903, Prescott) - MLB pitcher, Cleveland Indians and Chicago White Sox.
 John C. Munn - (born 1906, Prescott) - Assistant Commandant of the Marine Corps.
 Anita Pointer - entertainer, The Pointer Sisters.
 Charles Randolph Prim - (born 1896, Prescott) - NLB pitcher, Kansas City Monarchs.
 Floyd Robinson - (born 1936, Prescott) - MLB outfielder, Chicago White Sox, Cincinnati Reds, Oakland Athletics, and Boston Red Sox.
 Mike Ross (politician) - Arkansas Senate, US Representative and Democratic nominee for governor in 2014. (Arkansas's 4th congressional district)
 Ulysses "Slow Kid" Thompson - (born 1888, Prescott) - Vaudeville entertainer and promoter.
 John Shackelford - NLB outfielder, Cleveland Browns, Harrisburg Giants, Chicago American Giants, and Birmingham Black Barons.
 Paul Silas - (born 1943, Prescott) - NBA player and head coach.
 Chuck Tompkins - (born 1889, Prescott) - MLB pitcher, Cincinnati Reds.
 Daniel Eugene "Danny" Walters - (born 1960, Prescott) - NFL cornerback, San Diego Chargers.

Points of interest
 Carolina Methodist Church - (Private) A one-story wood frame rectangular ecclesiastical building that is an excellent example of early vernacular Greek Revival style architecture.
 De Ann Cemetery - Final resting place for early settlers of Prescott and Nevada County.
 Elkin's Ferry Battleground - National Historic Landmark of the Civil War.
 Moscow Methodist Church and Cemetery - (Private) Original area of local settlement and commerce prior to construction of the Cairo and Fulton Railroad.
 Historic Washington State Park - Located 25 miles southwest of Prescott, the park offers visitors guided tours which interpret the history of this pioneer settlement, originally located on the Southwest Trail. The park hosts Civil War reenactments, the annual Jonquil Festival, and a Christmas Festival.
 Prairie D'Ane Battlefield - National Historic Landmark of the Civil War.
 Prescott Commercial Historic District - Downtown Area of unique Architecture and Commerce.
 Prescott Raceway – Offers 1/4-mile drag racing.
 Sterling Square Park – Includes brick sidewalks with memorial pavers, benches, and a fountain. A mural illustrates historic scenes from the area.
 White Oak Lake State Park and Poison Springs Battleground State Park - Located 22 miles east of Prescott, the parks include campsites, pavilions, picnic sites, trails, playgrounds, and a visitor center with exhibits and interactive programs. The parks are an interpretation gateway to the Camden Expedition, and the Red River Campaign.

References

External links
 Prescott Arkansas Web Page
 National Register of Historic Places listings in Nevada County, Arkansas

Cities in Nevada County, Arkansas
Cities in Arkansas
County seats in Arkansas
Hope micropolitan area
Populated places established in 1873
1873 establishments in Arkansas